The Kadisha River or Nahr Abu Ali is a river in Lebanon. The river runs along the Kadisha Valley, carving out deep gorges.

On its passage through Tripoli, it is walled and partially covered. The river is very polluted.

References

Rivers of Lebanon